Jody Sears (born October 21, 1967) is an American college football coach and former player. He was the interim defensive coordinator for Nevada Wolf Pack. He served as the head coach at Weber State University from 2012 to 2013 and California State University, Sacramento from 2014 to 2018.

Early life and playing career
Sears attended Pullman High School in his native town of Pullman, Washington. He attend Washington State University, where he walked on to the Washington State Cougars football team as a wide receiver under head coach Mike Price.

Coaching career
In 1994, Sears attended graduate school at Iowa State University, where he earned his master's degree. There he served as a graduate assistant coach for the Iowa State Cyclones football team, where he coached wide receivers and defensive backs.

In 1998, Sears became the defensive coordinator at St. Ambrose University. Following a two-year stint at St. Ambrose, he was an assistant coach for three years at the United States Military Academy, before heading to Eastern Washington University as a defensive coordinator.

Sears spent three years as the co-defensive coordinator for the Washington State Cougars. After head coach Paul Wulff was fired in late 2011 new Washington State head coach Mike Leach did not keep any of the Wulff staff.

On April 2, 2012, Sears joined new head coach John L. Smith as the defensive coordinator at Weber State University. A few weeks later, when Smith stepped down to become the head coach at the University of Arkansas, Sears was asked to become the interim head coach.
In his two season as a head coach of Weber State, he compiled a record of 4–19 losses before he was relieved of his duties.

In 2014, he was named head coach at California State University, Sacramento.  In five years, he compiled an 20–35 record with two winning seasons. Their record in 2017 tied them for third in the Big Sky Conference standings, their best conference finish since 2010.

In 2019, Sears stepped in as defensive coordinator, on an interim basis, to coach the 2019 Nevada Wolf Pack football team in the 2020 Famous Idaho Potato Bowl (January) against Ohio.

Head coaching record

References

External links
 Washington State profile
 Weber State profile

1967 births
Living people
American football wide receivers
Army Black Knights football coaches
Eastern Washington Eagles football coaches
Iowa State Cyclones football coaches
Nevada Wolf Pack football coaches
Sacramento State Hornets football coaches
St. Ambrose Fighting Bees football coaches
Washington State Cougars football coaches
Washington State Cougars football players
Weber State Wildcats football coaches